Molle Glacier is a glacier,  wide, flowing north-northeast into the northern part of the Hannan Ice Shelf, Enderby Land, Antarctica. It was charted from air photos taken by Australian National Antarctic Research Expeditions in 1956, and was named by the Antarctic Names Committee of Australia for J.D. Molle, a radio officer at Davis Station in 1960.

See also
 List of glaciers in the Antarctic
 Glaciology

References

 

Glaciers of Enderby Land